Gandhi family may refer to:

The family of Mahatma Gandhi, one of the leader for Indian independence movement
The unrelated Nehru–Gandhi family, which has produced three Indian prime ministers